Elyas bin Omar (16 November 1936 – 15 May 2018) was the third Mayor of Kuala Lumpur, Malaysia as well the longest serving as Mayor in Kuala Lumpur history. He served for a period of 12 years. Elyas was the president of the Badminton Association of Malaysia (BAM) and during his tenure, Malaysia won the Thomas Cup in 1992. In football, Elyas was president of Kuala Lumpur FA when it won the Malaysia Cup three times in a row from 1987 to 1989. On 17 November 1992, he was succeeded by Mazlan Ahmad as Mayor of Kuala Lumpur.

Personal life
He married Fawziah Abdul Hamid, with whom he has three children and Dayang Normala Haji Awang Tambi with whom he has five children. In 2000, he divorced Fawziah Abdul Hamid.

Honours

Honours of Malaysia
 Malaysia:
  Officer of the Order of the Defender of the Realm (KMN) (1968)
  Companion of the Order of Loyalty to the Crown of Malaysia (JSM) (1976)
  Commander of the Order of Loyalty to the Crown of Malaysia (PSM) – Tan Sri (1990)
 Federal Territory (Malaysia):
  Grand Commander of the Order of the Territorial Crown (SMW) – Datuk Seri (2008)
  Grand Knight of the Order of the Territorial Crown (SUMW) – Datuk Seri Utama (2016)
 Pahang:
  Knight Companion of the Order of Sultan Ahmad Shah of Pahang (DSAP) – Dato'
  Grand Knight of the Order of the Crown of Pahang (SIMP) – Dato' Indera (1988)
 Selangor:
  Knight Companion of the Order of Sultan Salahuddin Abdul Aziz Shah (DSSA) – Dato' (1990)
  :
  Companion of the Order of the Defender of State (DMPN) – Dato' (1985)

Places named in honour of him
 Auditorium Elyas Omar.

References

External links
 Tan Sri Dato' Elyas Omar - Malaysian Government Archive

1936 births
2018 deaths
Malaysian people of Malay descent
Malaysian Muslims
Mayors of Kuala Lumpur
People from Penang
Officers of the Order of the Defender of the Realm
Companions of the Order of Loyalty to the Crown of Malaysia
Commanders of the Order of Loyalty to the Crown of Malaysia
University of Malaya alumni